In mathematics, the Fréchet derivative is a derivative defined on normed spaces. Named after Maurice Fréchet, it is commonly used to generalize the derivative of a real-valued function of a single real variable to the case of a vector-valued function of multiple real variables, and to define the functional derivative used widely in the calculus of variations.

Generally, it extends the idea of the derivative from real-valued functions of one real variable to functions on normed spaces. The Fréchet derivative should be contrasted to the more general Gateaux derivative which is a generalization of the classical directional derivative.

The Fréchet derivative has applications to nonlinear problems throughout mathematical analysis and physical sciences, particularly to the calculus of variations and much of nonlinear analysis and nonlinear functional analysis.

Definition 

Let  and  be normed vector spaces, and  be an open subset of  A function  is called Fréchet differentiable at  if there exists a bounded linear operator  such that

In this case,  is the function

Properties 

A function differentiable at a point is continuous at that point.

Finite dimensions 

The Fréchet derivative in finite-dimensional spaces is the usual derivative. In particular, it is represented in coordinates by the Jacobian matrix.

Suppose that  is a map,  with  an open set. If  is Fréchet differentiable at a point  then its derivative is

where  is the canonical basis of  Since the derivative is a linear function, we have for all vectors  that the directional derivative of  along  is given by

If all partial derivatives of  exist and are continuous, then  is Fréchet differentiable (and, in fact, C1). The converse is not true; the function

is Fréchet differentiable and yet fails to have continuous partial derivatives at

Example in infinite dimensions 

One of the simplest (nontrivial) examples in infinite dimensions, is the one where the domain is a Hilbert space and the function in interest is the norm. So consider 

Indeed, 
 

Using continuity of the norm and inner product we obtain:

As  and because of the Cauchy-Schwarz inequality
 
is bounded by  thus the whole limit vanishes.

Now we show that at  the norm is not differentiable, that is, there does not exist bounded linear functional  such that the limit in question to be  Let  be any linear functional.
 

In order for the norm to be differentiable at  we must have 
 

We will show that this is not true for any  If  obviously  independently of  hence this is not the derivative.
 

(If we take  tending to zero in the direction of  we would even see this limit does not exist since in this case we will obtain ).

The result just obtained agrees with the results in finite dimensions.

Relation to the Gateaux derivative 

A function  is called Gateaux differentiable at  if  has a directional derivative along all directions at  This means that there exists a function  such that

However, not every Gateaux differentiable function is Fréchet differentiable. This is analogous to the fact that the existence of all directional derivatives at a point does not guarantee total differentiability (or even continuity) at that point.
For example, the real-valued function  of two real variables defined by

is continuous and Gateaux differentiable at the origin , with its derivative at the origin being

The function  is not a linear operator, so this function is not Fréchet differentiable.

In another situation, the function  given by

A more subtle example is

However,  is not Fréchet differentiable. If it were, its Fréchet derivative would coincide with its Gateaux derivative, and hence would be the zero operator ; hence the limit

would have to be zero, whereas approaching the origin along the curve  shows that this limit does not exist.

These cases can occur because the definition of the Gateaux derivative only requires that the difference quotients converge along each direction individually, without making requirements about the rates of convergence for different directions. Thus, for a given ε, although for each direction the difference quotient is within ε of its limit in some neighborhood of the given point, these neighborhoods may be different for different directions, and there may be a sequence of directions for which these neighborhoods become arbitrarily small. If a sequence of points is chosen along these directions, the quotient in the definition of the Fréchet derivative, which considers all directions at once, may not converge. Thus, in order for a linear Gateaux derivative to imply the existence of the Fréchet derivative, the difference quotients have to converge uniformly for all directions.

The following example only works in infinite dimensions. Let

does not exist.

Higher derivatives 

If  is a differentiable function at all points in an open subset  of  it follows that its derivative

One may differentiate

again, to obtain the third order derivative, which at each point will be a trilinear map, and so on. The -th derivative will be a function

Moreover, we may obviously identify a member of the space  with a linear map  through the identification  thus viewing the derivative as a linear map.

Partial Fréchet derivatives 

In this section, we extend the usual notion of partial derivatives which is defined for functions of the form  to functions whose domains and target spaces are arbitrary (real or complex) Banach spaces. To do this, let  and  be Banach spaces (over the same field of scalars), and let  be a given function, and fix a point  We say that  has an i-th partial differential at the point  if the function  defined by

is Fréchet differentiable at the point  (in the sense described above). We can express this in the Landau notation as

Generalization to topological vector spaces 

The notion of the Fréchet derivative can be generalized to arbitrary topological vector spaces (TVS)  and  Letting  be an open subset of  that contains the origin and given a function  such that  we first define what it means for this function to have 0 as its derivative. We say that this function  is tangent to 0 if for every open neighborhood of 0,  there exists an open neighborhood of 0,  and a function  such that

and for all  in some neighborhood of the origin, 

(Lang p. 6)

If the Fréchet derivative exists then it is unique. Furthermore, the Gateaux derivative must also exist and be equal the Fréchet derivative in that for all 

where  is the Fréchet derivative. A function that is Fréchet differentiable at a point is necessarily continuous there and sums and scalar multiples of Fréchet differentiable functions are differentiable so that the space of functions that are Fréchet differentiable at a point form a subspace of the functions that are continuous at that point. The chain rule also holds as does the Leibniz rule whenever  is an algebra and a TVS in which multiplication is continuous.

See also

Notes

References 

 .
 .
 .
 .
 .
 .

External links

 B. A. Frigyik, S. Srivastava and M. R. Gupta, Introduction to Functional Derivatives, UWEE Tech Report 2008-0001.
 http://www.probability.net. This webpage is mostly about basic probability and measure theory, but there is nice chapter about Frechet derivative in Banach spaces (chapter about Jacobian formula). All the results are given with proof.

Banach spaces
Generalizations of the derivative